The Harmon Trophy is a set of three international trophies, to be awarded annually to the world's outstanding aviator, aviatrix, and aeronaut (balloon or dirigible).  A fourth trophy, the "National Trophy," was awarded from 1926 through 1938 to the most outstanding aviator in each of the twenty-one member countries and again from 1946–1948 to honor Americans who contributed to aviation. The award was established in 1926 by Clifford B. Harmon, a wealthy balloonist and aviator.

The awards are described by the Clifford B. Harmon Trust as:
"American awards for the most outstanding international achievements in the arts and/or science of aeronautics for the preceding year, with the art of flying receiving first consideration."

World War II and Harmon's death
Prior to World War II, the award was administered by the International League of Aviators (Ligue Internationale des Aviateurs), an organization founded by Harmon to serve as "an agent for Peace and National security." The League became defunct during the war and Harmon's death on June 25, 1945 in Cannes, France put the awards in turmoil. Harmon left $55,000 of his estate to continue funding the award in "perpetuity," but Harmon's relatives challenged the bequest. Ultimately, a trust fund of $48,431 was created in 1948.

During the period the awards were in litigation (1945–1948), the American Section of the League awarded the International Aviator Trophy to three U.S. leaders in aviation. However, since the awards were not approved by other League Sections, the awards are technically invalid. Also, these three awards were given without consideration to the "art of flying" and the awards did not recognize a superlative aviation achievement, rather recognized American aviation industry leaders. President Truman's staff questioned the award to Alexander de Seversky, Secretary of the Air Force Stuart Symington stating, "he [de Seversky] did absolutely nothing to deserve it." Truman also did not make time to present the 1948 award to Trans World Airlines CEO Ralph Damon or Brazilian aviation pioneer Francisco Pignatari The award to Pan American World Airways President Juan Trippe in 1946 was the only one presented without debate.

Since 1997 or 1998, the National Aeronautic Association has been responsible for awarding the trophies. With the exception of the Aeronaut trophy, all are inactive.

The trustees wrestled with how to treat space flight. Bound by the court to offer only three trophies, the trustees first agreed that "feats of piloting in both earth orbiting or outer space vehicles will be considered for the Harmon Awards provided the vehicles are controlled by their pilots rather than from the ground." The advisory committee directed the trustees to alternate awarding the aeronaut trophy between balloonists and astronauts, but the trustees decided to offer the aviator award to aviation and astronaut recipients. A fifth trophy was created in 1969 to honor achievements in space flight.

Some aviatrix awards from 1980–1990 were awarded by the Ninety-Nines based on research performed by Fay Gillis Wells. This work was not coordinated with the NAA or Smithsonian.

The original awards were 24-inch-tall bronze statues.  The aviator trophy depicts World War I flying ace Raoul Lufbery launching a biplane set next to an eagle about to take wing. The statuette was created by sculptor Roussadana M'divani. The Smithsonian Institution acquired the aviator's trophy in 1950 from the Clifford B. Harmon Trust. The aviatrix trophy depicts a winged goddess cradling a falcon with outstretched wings. The aeronaut trophy was lost in Germany between May 1940 and October 1953 and was believed to have been sold as scrap.  The three-foot-tall, 150-pound statue of five aviators holding the globe on their shoulders was found in a junk store and subsequently given to the Smithsonian after the presentation of the 1952 awards.

List of award winners
The following is an incomplete list compiled from several sources. The Aeronaut, National and Astronaut categories have not been listed in a central location. The NAA and the Smithsonian Institution's National Air and Space Museum worked to assemble a complete list to be published in conjunction with the NAA's hundredth anniversary in 2005, however this project was not completed and it appears that the source documents for a period of awards were destroyed.

National Aeronautic Association.

Source:

See also

 List of aviation awards

References

External links
Harmon Aeronaut Trophy (National Aeronautic Association)
National Air and Space Museum list
Harmon National Trophy for Australia

Aviation competitions and awards
Aviation awards
Awards established in 1926